Elections were held in Lanark County, Ontario on October 27, 2014, in conjunction with municipal elections across the province.

Lanark County Council
Lanark County Council consists of two members from each constituent municipality.

Beckwith

Carleton Place

Drummond/North Elmsley

Lanark Highlands

Mississippi Mills

Montague

Perth

Tay Valley

References
 

Lanark
Lanark County